The cactus cat is a legendary fearsome critter of the American Southwest.

The cactus cat was generally described being a bobcat-like creature, covered in hair-like thorns, with particularly long spines extending from the legs and its armored, branching tail. The creature was said to use its spines to slash cacti at night, allowing juice to run from the plants. On later nights, the creature was said to return to drink the now fermented juice.  

The then-drunken creature was said to howl throughout the night. The cactus cat was a very hostile creature towards any animal in its territory.  Animals that crossed them often ended up with large puncture wounds, and sometimes fatal injuries. It was a desert predator. To avoid the harsh heat, they'd carve out the inside of a cactus and sleep through the day. It would eat the bugs and juice of the cactus, keeping it hydrated. They were said to be immune to scorpion venom and would hunt them at night.

Cactus cats were social animals, often mating for life. They were said to live about 20 to 30 years. Before and during mating season, the male felines would break open a large Saguaro cactus and let the smell attract females to the location. Often enough, two females would be attracted to the scent, and fight. The fight usually ended in one of them getting brutally spiked or stabbed to death. The winning female would then meet with the male and drink the cactus juice. The pair would get drunk and then produce a litter of kittens within the next few weeks. The kittens were born blind at birth with no spikes.

References

Footnotes

Original Author: Peter Maly The Lost Feline: A Unknown Cryptid
O'Conner, Elizabeth. Here There Were Dragons: New England's Forgotten Cryptozoological Phenomena. St. Paul, Minnesota: Llewellyn, 1994.

Fearsome critters
Mythological felines
Cat folklore